The following are the national records in athletics in the Republic of Yemen maintained by Yemen's national athletics federation: Yemen Amateur Athletic Federation (YAAF).

Outdoor

Men

Women

Indoor

Men

Women

References

External links

Yemeni
Records
Athletics
Athletics